It's All Gone Pete Tong is a 2004 British-Canadian mockumentary-drama film about a DJ (Paul Kaye) who goes completely deaf. The title uses a rhyming slang phrase used in Britain from the 1980s (Pete Tong = "wrong"), referring to the BBC Radio 1 DJ Pete Tong.

It won two awards at the US Comedy Arts Festival for Best Feature and Best Actor (Kaye) and swept the Gen Art Film Festival awards (Grand Jury and Audience). It was filmed on location in Ibiza and shot entirely in HD.

Ibiza locations used in the movie include the music venues Pacha, Amnesia, Privilege, DC10 and the historic Pike's Hotel and Cala Llonga beach.

Plot

Frankie Wilde is a British music producer and a DJ based in Ibiza. After years of playing in night-clubs he loses his hearing, first apparent when he hears a high-pitched whine instead of an Arsenal football match on TV. At this time, Frankie is making his next album with his "two Austrian mates" Alfonse and Horst, but his hearing degrades rapidly and progress stagnates. Frankie refuses to acknowledge his problem until a gig in Amnesia, when he cannot hear the second channel in his headphones and must crossfade one song into the next without being able to beatmatch them. When the crowd boos him, he throws the turntable and the mixer onto the dance floor, and is forcibly removed from the club.

Frankie agrees to see a doctor, who tells him he has lost hearing in one ear and has 20% left in the other. He warns Frankie that unless he stops abusing drugs and listening to loud noises, he will soon be completely deaf, and even the use of his hearing aid would only further degrade his hearing. During a recording session, Frankie confesses the full nature of his hearing loss to Alfonse. He inserts his hearing aid to demonstrate and, overwhelmed by the sudden sound exposure, leans close to one of the monitor speakers. Before he can react, a frustrated Horst smashes a guitar into an amplifier whose volume Frankie has maximized. The noise is excruciating and the feedback bursts his eardrum, knocking Frankie unconscious. The damage leaves him permanently deaf.

Without his hearing, Frankie cannot complete his album. He loses his recording contract and his manager Max abandons him. Soon after, his wife Sonya leaves him. Frankie shuts himself into his home, which he has "soundproofed" with pillows in a desperate bid to recover his hearing, and his drug use intensifies. He sinks into a heavy depression, repeatedly throwing his body against the walls, and wrapping Roman candles around his head, either an attempt at suicide or a drastic way to recover his hearing, but dives into the pool before they ignite. Frankie flushes all his drugs down a toilet, but is once again tormented by a vision of a menacing coke badger, and when he fights and kills it, he learns that the badger is, in fact, himself.

Frankie finds a deaf organization and meets Penelope, who coaches him in lip-reading. They become close, and eventually intimate. He confides his unhappiness at losing music, and she helps him perceive sound through visual and tactile methods instead. Frankie manages to devise a system for mixing songs, in which he watches an oscilloscope trace while resting his feet on the pulsating speakers. Using this system, he manages to produce a new mix CD (Hear No Evil) entirely by himself. He delivers it to Max, who is wildly pleased – particularly by the potential of exploiting Frankie's disability to increase record sales. He has Frankie take part in promotions that are increasingly offensive and insensitive to deaf people, of which Penelope disapproves.

Max convinces Frankie to play live at Pacha as a career comeback, despite Frankie's insistence that he has nothing to prove to his critics. The gig goes exceedingly well, and many claim it shows even greater talent than his early work. After the show, Frankie and Penelope disappear from Max and the music scene altogether. In a talking heads sequence, characters speculate on where he is now, if alive. As the film ends, we see Frankie disguised as a homeless street musician, who is met by Penelope carrying their child. They affectionately walk together down a street unrecognised. Additionally, we see Frankie teaching a group of deaf children how to perceive sound like he does.

Characters and cast

 Frankie Wilde (Paul Kaye) is the king of DJs, slowly losing his hearing, and soon to lose everything he thinks is important to him: his job, his fame and his trophy wife.
 Penelope (Beatriz Batarda) is the deaf lip-reading instructor who gives Frankie the tough love he never had and always needed.
 Sonya (Kate Magowan) is Frankie's supermodel wife. Her days are filled with deciding on what theme is more appropriate for their garden: Japanese or Spanish?
 Max Haggar (Mike Wilmot) is Frankie's agent. Fat, balding and brash, Max is all about money and his mobile phone is his lifeline.
 Jack Stoddart (Neil Maskell) is the ruthless CEO of Motor Records who has no sympathy for Frankie. He says, "I didn’t want a deaf DJ on the label. I didn’t want the company to be touched with the deaf stamp. Well, business is tough and sometimes you have to make awkward decisions and I’ve made harder decisions than dropping the deaf DJ."

Cameos
Several real world DJs appear in the film, lending the film a sense of authenticity, like Carl Cox, Fatboy Slim and Pete Tong himself, who also executive produced the film. Others include Tiësto, Sarah Main, Barry Ashworth, Paul van Dyk and Lol Hammond.

Fubar rockers Paul Spence and David Lawrence, from Dowse's earlier film, also have cameos as Austrian hangers-on.

Music

Soundtrack
The film's soundtrack was released by EMI on 4 October 2005 as a double disc soundtrack for the film. The 'Night' & 'Day' concept for the soundtrack album was conceived and compiled by Ben Cherrill, who was, at the time, A&R manager for Positiva Records/EMI. Additional production and mixing was by James Doman.

 Track listing
 CD 1
 "Pacific State" – 808 State (exclusive mix)
 "Cloud Watch" – Lol Hammond
 "Dry Pool Suicide" – Graham Massey
 "Moonlight Sonata" – Graham Massey
 "Baby Piano" – Lol Hammond
 "Ku Da Ta" – Pete Tong (Jay & Dylan McHugh Re-Work)
 "Mirage" – Moroccan Blonde (Ben Cherrill, James Doman and Lol Hammond)
 "Troubles" – Beta Band
 "Parlez Moi D'Amour" – Lucienne Boyer
 "Need To Feel Loved (Horizontal Mix)" – Reflekt
 "It's Over" – Beta Band
 "Halo (Goldfrapp Remix)" – Depeche Mode
 "How Does It Feel?" – Afterlife
 "Holdin' On" – Ferry Corsten
 "Four-Four-Four" – Fragile State
 "Music for a Found Harmonium"	– Penguin Café Orchestra
 "Learning to Lip-Read" – Graham Massey
 "Good Vibrations" – The Beach Boys
 "Interlude" – Ben Cherrill and James Doman
 "White Lines" – Barefoot

 CD 2
 "Intro"
 "DJs in a Row" – Schwab
 "Flashdance (Raul Rincon Mix)" – Deep Dish
 "Good 2 Go" – Juggernaut (Ben Cherrill and James Doman) Mixed With "Rock That House Musiq" – Christophe Monier and DJ Pascal feat. Impulsion
 "Blue Water" – Black Rock
 "Back to Basics" – Shapeshifters
 "Up & Down" – Scent
 "Serendipity" – Steve Mac & Pete Tong Presents Lingua Franca
 "Plastic Dreams (Radio Edit)"	– Jaydee
 "Rock Your Body Rock" – Ferry Corsten
 "Can You Hear Me Now"	– Double Funk feat. Paul Kaye (Ben Cherrill and James Doman)
 "Musak (Steve Lawler Mix)" – Trisco
 "Yimanya" – Filterheadz
 "Need To Feel Loved (Seb Fontaine and Jay P's Mix)" – Reflekt feat. Delline Bass
 "More Intensity" – Pete Tong and Chris Cox
 "Frenetic (Short Mix)" – Orbital

Score
Songs used in film but not included in the soundtrack:
 "Al Sharp" – The Beta Band
 "Flamenco" – Flamenco Ibiza
 "Get On" – Moguai
 "G-Spot" – Lol Hammond
 "Hear No Evil" – Lol Hammond
 "I Like It (Sinewave Surfer Mix)" – Narcotic Thrust
 "Messa da Requiem" – Riccardo Muti/La Scala Milan
 "Electronika" – Vada
 "Rise Again" – DJ Sammy
 "Ritcher Scale Madness" – ...And You Will Know Us by the Trail of Dead
 "The Aviator" – Michael McCann
 "Up & Down (Super Dub)" – Scent
 "You Can't Hurry Love" – The Concretes
 "Rock That House Musiq" – Impulsion

Release
The film was premiered at the 2004 Toronto International Film Festival. It was released in the United States on 15 April 2005 and on 26 May in the United Kingdom.

Home media
The DVD was released on 20 September 2005. The U.S. version of the DVD includes 5.1 Dolby Digital, subtitles and several extras that were part of the online/web marketing campaign: Frankie Wilde: The Rise, Frankie Wilde: The Fall and Frankie Wilde: The Redemption.

Reception

Commercial performance
The film made $2,226,603, a little under a quarter million above its $2 million budget.

Critical response
The film has a rating of 76% based on 71 reviews on the review aggregator website Rotten Tomatoes, the critical consensus stating, "Part raucous mockumentary, part drama-filled biopic, It's All Gone Pete Tong amuses and warms hearts with its touching, comic, and candid look at a musician faced with a career-ending handicap." On Metacritic, it has a score of 56 based on 22 reviews, indicating "mixed or average reviews".

Giving the film three stars, Roger Ebert says the film works because of its "heedless comic intensity", chronicling the rise and fall of Frankie Wilde in the film's first two acts "as other directors have dealt with emperors and kings".Frankie may not be living the most significant life of our times, but tell that to Frankie. There is a kind of desperation in any club scene (as 24-Hour Party People memorably demonstrated); it can be exhausting, having a good time, and the relentless pursuit of happiness becomes an effort to recapture remembered bliss from the past.

Melissa Mohaupt writing in Exclaim! noted "resemblances to various hipster films about music, drugs, excess and failure" such as Trainspotting, Boogie Nights, yet it "never feels stale". There are plenty of quotable quips, and even Frankie's attempted suicide is "high-larious". She says the film manages to be "uplifting without being preachy or cheesy. There are important life lessons to be learned here, or you could just ignore them and enjoy some clever comedy."

Ken Eisner of The Georgia Straight liked the film's "zippy visual style, with sun-dappled primary colours and whirlwind editing to go with the hip pop tunes and block-rockin' beats". He appreciated the fact that Dowse does not milk the many cameos, though the two Fubar actors may have been a bit much. Dennis Harvey, writing for Variety, found those first two acts depressing and decidedly not as advertized (the film was hyped as another This is Spinal Tap), but Michael Dowse rescues the film with "a particularly deft transitional montage that begins with Frankie discovering the musical properties of vibration... segues into lead duo's first lovemaking, and goes on as Frankie re-connects with the dance rhythms he’d thought were lost to him".

Nick De Semlyen, writing for Empire, gave the film two stars, noting there were powerful moments in the film, but thought it was "too dark for casual viewers (or fans of Tong), too blunt to succeed as cult viewing". The Guardian'''s Peter Bradshaw gave the film one star, panning it as "breathtakingly charmless and humourless", writing that "Paul Kaye gives a frazzled, one-note performance", while the "appearances by real-life DJs should tip you off that any satire involved is of an essentially celebratory and sycophantic sort; the comedy is leaden, the drama is flat and the attitude to deaf people is Neanderthal".

Accolades
Awards
 Toronto International Film Festival, Best Canadian Feature – 2004
 US Comedy Arts Festival, Best Feature, Best Actor (Paul Kaye) – 2005
 Gen Art Film Festival, Grand Jury Award, Audience Award – 2005
 Vancouver Film Critics Circle, Best British Columbian Film – 2005
 Canadian Comedy Awards, Best Performance by a Male - Film (Mike Wilmot) – 2005
 Leo Awards Best Overall Sound, Best Sound Editing, Best Feature-Length Drama – 2005

Nominations
  Method Fest, Best Actor, Best Feature
  BIFA, Best Achievement in Production 
 Genie Awards (8)

Adaptations
The film was remade in Hindi by the Indian film director Neerav Ghosh, titled Soundtrack'' and was released in 2011.

See also
 List of films featuring the deaf and hard of hearing

References

External links
 Official web site
 FrankieWilde.com
 Official trailer on YouTube
 
 

2004 films
2000s English-language films
HanWay Films films
Vertigo Films films
Canadian mockumentary films
Canadian independent films
Canadian comedy films
English-language Canadian films
Films directed by Michael Dowse
Deaf culture in the United Kingdom
British Sign Language films
Films set in Ibiza
Films about DJs
Films about deaf people
2000s Canadian films